The 1988–89 season of the Venezuelan Primera División, the top category of Venezuelan football, was played by 16 teams. The national champions were Mineros de Guayana.

Results

Standings

External links
Venezuela 1989 season at RSSSF

Venezuelan Primera División seasons
Ven
Ven
1988–89 in Venezuelan football